is a district located in Fukushima Prefecture, Japan.

As of 2003, the district has an estimated population of 68,450 and a density of 138.39 persons per km2. The total area is 494.63 km2.

Towns and villages
Yabuki
Izumizaki
Nakajima
Nishigō

Merger
 On November 7, 2005 the villages of Higashi, Omotegō and Taishin merged into the city of Shirakawa.

Districts in Fukushima Prefecture